Dorofeyev is a Russian surname that is derived from the male given name Dorofey and literally means Dorofey's. It may refer to:

 Artyom Dorofeyev (born 1992), Russian professional ice hockey player
 Dmitry Dorofeyev (born 1976), Russian speed skater
 Igor Dorofeyev (born 1968), Russian ice hockey forward
 Sergei Dorofeyev (born 1986), Russian ice hockey defenceman

Russian-language surnames
Patronymic surnames
Surnames from given names